Keele railway station is a disused railway station in Staffordshire, England.

The Stoke to Market Drayton Line was opened by the North Staffordshire Railway (NSR) in 1870.  The station, then called  Keele Road was opened on the same day as the line opened.  In 1898 the station was renamed Keele.

The line through the station was singled in 1934 and the number of platforms reduced to one but the line through the disused platform was retained as a passing loop for goods trains.

Passenger traffic at the station was withdrawn in 1956 and goods traffic was withdrawn in January 1967 when the station closed altogether.  The line through the station remained in use until the closure of Silverdale Colliery in 1998.

Present Day

The tracks from Silverdale to Pipe Gate remain in place but overgrown and out of use.

References
Notes

Sources

Further reading

Disused railway stations in Staffordshire
Former North Staffordshire Railway stations
Railway stations in Great Britain closed in 1956
Railway stations in Great Britain opened in 1870